Tembleque is a municipality located in the province of Toledo, Castile-La Mancha, Spain. 
According to the 2010 census (INE), the municipality had a population of 2 390 inhabitants, but it has since declined.

History
The name is of Iberian origin. At that time there were a lot of villages with names ending in "que".

After the reconquest of Toledo, the village belonged to the Knights Hospitaller.

Heraldry
The town has a coat of arms featuring three towers over a small mountain and a cannon.(see note)
The cannon symbolises the town's historical link with the artillery.(see note)

Landmarks

Buildings of interest include:
 the main square (Plaza Mayor)
 the church of the Assumption (Nuestra Señora de la Asunción), which dates from the 16th century.

Famous inhabitants
Francisco de Tembleque gave his name to the Aqueduct of Padre Tembleque in Mexico. 
This structure is now a World Heritage Site.

 Nena Goodman (1910-1998), New York artist and philanthropist

Notes
1.In heraldry "escutcheon" would be a more precise translation of the Spanish term escudo than "coat of arms".
2.The village supplied saltpetre for making gunpowder.

References

External links 

Municipalities in the Province of Toledo